Connor Alan Waldon (born 13 February 1995) is an English footballer who plays for Swindon Supermarine. He made five league appearances professionally for Swindon Town

Career

Swindon Town
Waldon began his footballing career within Wiltshire junior football where he was discovered by Swindon Town youth director Jeremy Newton.

With Swindon Town suffering an end-of-season injury crisis, Waldon was among the youth players selected for first team duty by Swindon Town manager Kevin MacDonald. Francis made his Swindon debut as a late second-half substitute against Stevenage on Saturday 21 April 2013.

On 15 January 2014, Connor joined Tamworth on loan.

Career statistics

Club

References

External links

1995 births
Living people
Sportspeople from Swindon
English footballers
Association football forwards
Swindon Town F.C. players
Frome Town F.C. players
Gloucester City A.F.C. players
Tamworth F.C. players
Brackley Town F.C. players
Swindon Supermarine F.C. players
Mangotsfield United F.C. players
English Football League players
National League (English football) players
North Leigh F.C. players